Elannummel Shiva temple is a Hindu temple located in the Chelembra, Malappuram district of the Indian state of Kerala. The temple is thought to be more than 2000 years old and is believed to have consecrated by Lord Parasurama. The primary deity is Lord Shiva. Elannummel temple contains a smaller Vishnu temple in which the deity is represented as "Santhanagopalan".

History
The legend is that Parasuraman consecrated this temple as one of several he founded in Kerala to promote the Sanathana Dharma.  The temple was previously supported by several "Manas" in the Chelembra. The temple was attacked by Tippu Sultan, causing severe damage to the structures attached to the temple.

References

Hindu pilgrimage sites in India
Hindu temples in Malappuram district
Shiva temples in Kerala